AFI's 100 Years...100 Songs is a list of the top 100 songs in American cinema of the 20th century. The list was unveiled by the American Film Institute on June 22, 2004, in a CBS television special hosted by John Travolta, who appeared in two films honored by the list, Saturday Night Fever and Grease. The list was created by a panel of jurors selected by AFI, who voted from a list of 400 nominated songs.

Most represented films 
Singin' in the Rain, The Sound of Music, and West Side Story each have three songs on the list, while
The Wizard of Oz, A Star Is Born (#11 & #16) from the 1954 and 
1976 film versions, Funny Girl, and Meet Me in St. Louis each have two entries.

Most represented composers 
 Richard Rodgers – 6 songs
 Harold Arlen – 5 songs
 Leonard Bernstein – 4 songs
 Jule Styne – 3 songs
 Irving Berlin – 3 songs
 George Gershwin – 3 songs
 Nacio Herb Brown – 3 songs
 John Kander – 3 songs
 Jerome Kern – 3 songs

Most represented lyricists 
 Oscar Hammerstein II – 6
 Ira Gershwin – 4
 Irving Berlin – 3
 Stephen Sondheim – 3
 Arthur Freed – 3
 Fred Ebb – 3

Most represented singers 
Judy Garland (also listed in first place for "Over the Rainbow") and Gene Kelly are tied with five songs each; all of Garland's songs and two of Kelly's are solos. Julie Andrews, Fred Astaire, Marni Nixon, and Barbra Streisand follow Garland and Kelly with four songs each. All of the songs performed by Astaire and Streisand are ranked within the top half of the list. Astaire was co-credited for three out of his four songs listed, while Streisand performed all four of her songs by herself.

The list

References

External links
 AFI's list of the 400 nominated songs (PDF)

AFI 100 Years... series
Centennial anniversaries
Lists of rated songs